Bifrenaria tetragona is a species of orchid.

tetragona